{{DISPLAYTITLE:C6H4N2S}}
The molecular formula C6H4N2S may refer to:
 1,2,3-Benzothiadiazole, a benzene ring that is fused to a 1,2,3-thiadiazole
 2,1,3-Benzothiadiazole, a benzene ring that is fused to a 1,2,5-thiadiazole